Ajmal is both a given name and a surname. Notable people with the name include:
 Badruddin Ajmal, Indian politician
 M. Ajmal, Pakistani film old best actor
 Ajmal Ameer, Indian actor in Tamil and Malayalam film Industries
 Ajmal Kasab, Pakistani terrorist
 Ajmal Khattak, Pakistani politician
 Ajmal Masroor, British imam, broadcaster and politician
 Ajmal Naqshbandi, journalist's interpreter executed by the Taliban
 Ajmal Mian, Pakistani judge
 Ajmal Shahzad, English cricketer 
 Ajmal Shams, Afghan politician

Pakistani masculine given names
Surnames of Pakistani origin